Xi Gang; 1746-1803 was a renowned seal carver and painter in Qing Dynasty. He was born in Qiántáng (钱塘, present day Hangzhou). His style name was Chunzhang (纯章) and his pseudonym was Tiesheng (铁生). Other names include Hezhusheng (鹤注生) and Mengquan Waishi (蒙泉 外史). His specialty was in painting landscapes. His seal carving method was similar to that of Ding Jing (丁敬) (with whom he co-founded the Zhe School of carving), though somewhat cleaner and sharper. His style is representative of the Southern School. He was also talented in prose and calligraphy.

Notes

References
 Ci hai bian ji wei yuan hui (辞海编辑委员会）. Ci hai （辞海）. Shanghai: Shanghai ci shu chu ban she （上海辞书出版社）, 1979.

1746 births
1803 deaths